Jan Huppen (born 24 September 1942) was a Dutch boxer. Jan passed on October 19, 2018. He competed in the bantamweight classification at the 1964 Summer Olympics in Tokyo and finished in 17th position.

Huppen ran a boxing club in Amsterdam.

1964 Olympic results
Below is the record of Jan Huppen, a Dutch bantamweight boxer who competed at the 1964 Tokyo Olympics:

 Round of 32: lost to Louis Johnson (United States) by decision, 0-5

References

1942 births
Living people
Olympic boxers of the Netherlands
Boxers at the 1964 Summer Olympics
Boxers from Amsterdam
Bantamweight boxers
Dutch male boxers